Colin Webb (20 January 1926 – 2015) was an Australian cricketer. He played in six first-class matches for South Australia in 1945/46.

See also
 List of South Australian representative cricketers

References

External links
 

1926 births
2015 deaths
Australian cricketers
South Australia cricketers
Cricketers from Adelaide